Luís Miguel Rocha (February 1976 in Porto – 26 March 2015 in Mazaferes) was a Portuguese author, television writer and producer. He became a New York Times bestseller in 2009.

Biography
Rocha was born in Porto, and raised in Viana do Castelo. Prior to publishing his first novel, Rocha wrote and produced television in London. Rocha's second novel, The Last Pope, was published in 2006. The novel examines the conspiracy theories about the death of Pope John Paul I.

The Holy Bullet, also known as The Holy Assassin, his third novel, was published in 2007. The Pope's Assassin, also known as The Papal Decree is the third book of the Vatican series. The last book of the series is A Filha Do Papa, released in 2013.

Rocha died in March 2015 after a prolonged illness.

Works

Vatican Series 
 O Último Papa (2006) The Last Pope
 Bala Santa (2007) The Holy Bullet
 A Mentira Sagrada (2011) The Pope's Assassin
 A Filha do Papa (2013)
 A Resignação (2018) after death.

Others 
 Um País Encantado (2005)
 A Virgem (2009)
 Curiosidades do Vaticano (2016) after death.

References

External links
 Official website

1976 births
2015 deaths
21st-century novelists
People from Porto
Portuguese novelists
Male novelists
Portuguese male writers
Portuguese television producers
20th-century novelists
20th-century male writers
21st-century male writers